Baresi is a surname. Notable people with the surname include:

 Franco Baresi (born 1960), Italian football youth team coach, player, and manager
 Giuseppe Baresi (born 1958), Italian footballer and manager
 Regina Baresi (born 1991), Italian footballer 
 Sérgio Baresi (born 1973), Brazilian footballer and manager